Georgios Romeos (14 April 1934 – 24 February 2023) was a Greek writer and politician. A member of PASOK, he served as a Member of the European Parliament from 1984 to 1993.

Romeos died in Athens on 24 February 2023, at the age of 88.

References

1934 births
2023 deaths
Greek politicians
Greek male writers
MEPs for Greece 1984–1989
MEPs for Greece 1989–1994
PASOK MEPs
Ministers of Public Order of Greece
PASOK politicians
Politicians from Corfu